Hercules the Invincible (Italian: Ercole l'invincibile) is a 1964 Italian Sword and Sandal film directed by Alvaro Mancori and Lewis Mann and starring Dan Vadis.  It is the first of two directing credits for cinematographer Alvaro Mancori.

The film was later released to American television retitled Son of Hercules in the Land of Darkness as part of the Sons of Hercules TV syndication package.

Plot
Hercules saves a woman named Telca from a lion and arrives in triumph in her village. Telca's father King Tedaeo offers Hercules Telca's hand in marriage, if he brings back the tooth of a dragon.  Hercules seeks help from a witch who gives him a spear that will kill the dragon but wants the same tooth as her reward.  As Hercules has promised the tooth to King Tedaeo the witch warns him that the magic of the tooth will only work once.

In Hercules' absence Telca's village has been pillaged with all the survivors save Babar the comedy relief, are taken as prisoners to the Demulus, a tribe that lives inside a mountain and eats the hearts of their prisoners.

Cast 
Dan Vadis as Ercole (Argolese)
Spela Rozin as Telca
Carla Calò as Ella, Queen of the Demulus
Ken Clark as Kabol, Melissia's Father
Jon Simons as Babar
 Eric Schenk as Jerckules the abandoned son
Jannette Barton as Etel
Ugo Sasso as King Tedaeo, Telca's Father
Howard Ross as Telca's Brother
Olga Solbelli as The Oracle
Alberto Cevenini as Capt. of the Guard
Tricia Pettitt as Slave Girl Supervisor
Rosemarie Lindt as Slave Girl
Kriss Moss as Guard
Jannette Le Roy as Slave Girl
Sara Laurier as Slave Girl
Christine Mathius as Slave Girl
Matt Malinowski as Slave Man

Reception
From contemporary reviews, an anonymous review in The Monthly Film Bulletin noted that "the sloth-like hero belongs to the more dim-witted school of muscle-men, so that it takes a companion, in the shape of a comically cowardly assistant to demonstrate by contrast the heroic stature of Hercules." The review noted "there is some modestly colourful spectacle in the scenes of the underground city and its destruction by lava."

References

External links 

 (dubbed in English)

1964 films
1960s fantasy films
Italian fantasy adventure films
1960s fantasy adventure films
1960s Italian-language films
Peplum films
Films scored by Francesco De Masi
Sword and sandal films